Kinvara GAA is a Gaelic Athletic Association club located in the town of Kinvara in County Galway, Ireland.  The club is almost exclusively concerned with hurling but also plays Gaelic Football at Junior level.

History
The club was formed as Killoveragh GAA Club in 1889, which brought together the men of Kinvara, Dooras and Killina. The club later changed its name to Kinvara GAA Club. The 1970s will always be remembered for the Kinvara Senior hurling team reaching the County Final for the first time in 1979. They were defeated by a Castlegar team, backboned by the Connolly brothers.

The Kinvara Intermediate Hurling team who defeated Kilconieron on a scoreline of 1-10 to 0-12 to win the Galway Intermediate Hurling Championship In 2019.

Honours
Galway Senior Hurling Championship (0): (runner-up in 1979 and 2007)
 Galway Intermediate Hurling Championship (2): 1966, 2019	
 Galway Junior Hurling Championship (2): 1959, 1975
U21 B Championship 2003
U21 A Championship 2004

Notable players
Gerry McInerney
Colm Callanan
Shane Kavanagh
Conor Whelan
Tressa Griffin
Big Rohan Kilkelly
Margaret Keville

References

External links
Official Kinvara GAA Club website
Kinvara GAA on gaainfo.com

Gaelic games clubs in County Galway
Hurling clubs in County Galway